Babul Mora Naihar Chhooto Jaye is a popular Hindustani classical music song (thumri) in Raag Bhairavi.

History
The song was written by Nawab Wajid Ali Shah, the 19th-century Nawab of Awadh, as a lament when he was exiled from his beloved Lucknow by the British Raj before the failed Rebellion of 1857. He uses the bidaai (bride's farewell) of a bride from her father's (babul) home as a metaphor for his own banishment from his beloved Lucknow to far away Calcutta, where he spent the rest of his years.

It was also popularised by the legendary classical vocalist, Pandit Bhimsen Joshi.

Bollywood version
The most remembered version of the song is by actor-singer Kundan Lal Saigal for the Hindi movie Street Singer (1938) directed by Phani Majumdar, live on camera, under the music direction of Rai Chand Boral, just as playback singing was becoming popular. Jagjit and Chitra Singh also sang a version of the song in film Avishkaar (1973), set to music by Kanu Roy. Recently Arijit Singh has also sung a version of the song in a 2017 movie Poorna: Courage Has No Limit.

Text and translation

References

Indian songs
Hindi songs
19th-century poems
Thumri
History of Lucknow
Indian Rebellion of 1857
Exile
19th-century songs
Year of song unknown